Fancy Free may refer to:

Music 
 Fancy Free (Donald Byrd album) (1969)
 Fancy Free (Richard Davis album) (1977)
 Fancy Free (The Oak Ridge Boys album) (1981)

Other uses 
 Fancy Free (ballet), a ballet by Jerome Robbins
 Fancy Free (Australian TV program), a 1961 music variety television show
 Fancy Free (Canadian TV program), a 1960 music variety television show
 Fancy Free, a 1918 Broadway show by Augustus Barratt